Qiaodong District is a former district of Shijiazhuang, the capital of Hebei Province in North China. The district was abolished in September 2014, and its administrative area was split and merged into Chang'an and Qiaoxi districts.

Administrative divisions
There were 9 subdistricts and 1 town in the district.

East Zhongshan Road Subdistrict
Penghou Subdistrict
Dongfeng Subdistrict
Donghua Subdistrict
Xiumen Subdistrict
Fukang Subdistrict
Jian'an Subdistrict
Shengli North Subdistrict
Huitong Subdistrict
Taoyuan Town

External links

County-level divisions of Hebei
Shijiazhuang